Abantis elegantula, the elegant paradise skipper, is a butterfly in the family Hesperiidae. It is found in Guinea, Sierra Leone, Ivory Coast, Ghana, Nigeria and Cameroon. The habitat consists of forests, including forest-savanna mosaic.

Adult males mud-puddle.

References

Butterflies described in 1890
Tagiadini
Butterflies of Africa